Loraine Gonzales (born October 6, 1977) is a Wheelchair basketball player who was on the US team that won gold in Wheelchair basketball at the 2008 Summer Paralympics. She is of the Dallas–Fort Worth metroplex. Her husband David is also a wheelchair basketball player.

References

External links 
Team USA bio

1977 births
Living people
Paralympic wheelchair basketball players of the United States
Paralympic gold medalists for the United States
Sportspeople from the Dallas–Fort Worth metroplex
Medalists at the 2008 Summer Paralympics
Paralympic medalists in wheelchair basketball
Wheelchair basketball players at the 2008 Summer Paralympics